Liaka Kusulaka (Greek:  , on his coins; Prakrit: Liaka Kusulaka or  , , on the Taxila copper plate) was an Indo-Scythian satrap of the area of Chukhsa in the northwestern South Asia during the 1st century BCE.

Name
Liaka Kusulaka name is recorded on his coins in the Greek form , and on the Taxila copper plate in the Kharosthi form . The name is composed od from Saka , meaning "youth" and  "striving, ambitious, energetic".

Reign

He minted coins which are direct imitations of the coins of Eucratides (King's head and Dioscuri), with his name inscribed "ΛΙΑΚΟ ΚΟΖΟΥΛΟ".

The name "Κοζουλο" was also used by the first Kushan ruler Kujula Kadphises (Greek: Κοζουλου Καδφιζου, Kozoulou Kadphizou or Κοζολα Καδαφες, Kozola Kadaphes), which may suggest some family connection.

Notes

External links
Dates for Kanishka and the Indo-Scythians
Liaka Kusulaka onomastics

Indo-Scythian satraps
1st-century BC Iranian monarchs
1st-century BC Iranian people